Gisborne City AFC was an association football club in Gisborne, New Zealand.

Founded in 1939 as Eastern Union, the club changed its name to Gisborne City after winning the Central Districts League at the first attempt in 1967.

As Eastern Union, the club had competed in the Chatham Cup since the early 1950s, and reached the semi-final (and North Island Final) in 1957, losing to eventual champions Seatoun 3–1.

Gisborne set the New Zealand record for the most players from one club to be chosen  for the New Zealand national football team to compete at a FIFA World Cup. Five players were selected to participate in the 1982 FIFA World Cup in Spain.

In 1984 Gisborne became the first team from outside New Zealand's three biggest cities Auckland, Wellington, and Christchurch to win the national championship.

Honours

National
 New Zealand National Soccer League
Champions (1) 1984

 Chatham Cup
Champions (1) 1987

FIFA World Cup

World Cup All Whites
The following players represented the New Zealand national team also known as the All Whites at a FIFA World Cup whilst playing for Gisborne City:

1982 FIFA World Cup
  Kenny Cresswell
  John Hill
  Keith Mackay
  Brian Turner
  Grant Turner did not play due to injury upon arrival in Spain

Chelsea FC

Chelsea Connection
The Chelsea song Blue is the Colour was adopted as the clubs anthem.

The following former Chelsea FC players also played for Gisborne City:

  Brian Turner

  Ken Armstrong

Exhibitions

Professional Clubs

1982

vs  Bournemouth 0-4

National Teams

1985

vs
 New Zealand  3-4

Notable Players 
Jock Aird

References

https://teara.govt.nz/en/football/page-2

Association football clubs in New Zealand
Gisborne, New Zealand
Sport in the Gisborne District
1939 establishments in New Zealand